Gregory J. Neimeyer is a professor of psychology at the University of Florida. In 2009 he was appointed associate executive director for professional development and continuing education at the American Psychological Association.

He is a fellow of the Global Healthspan Policy Institute in Washington, D.C.

Personal life

His brother Dr. Robert "Bob" A. Neimeyer is also a professor and scholar of psychology. In 2016 he married American lobbyist Edwina Rogers.

Publications

As editor:
 Casebook of Constructivist Assessment. New York: Sage Publications, 1993

As co-editor with Robert A. Neimeyer:
 Personal Construct Therapy Casebook. New York: Springer, 1987
 Advances in Personal Construct Psychology, volume 1. Greenwich, Connecticut: JAI Press, 1990
 Advances in Personal Construct Psychology, volume 2, Greenwich: JAI Press, 1992
 Advances in Personal Construct Psychology, volume 3. Greenwich: JAI Press, 1995
 Advances in Personal Construct Psychology, volume 4. Greenwich: JAI Press, 1997
 Advances in Personal Construct Psychology, volume 5. New York: Praeger Publications, 2002

As guest editor:
 Personal Constructs in Career Counseling and Development, special issue of the Journal of Career Development 18 (3).

References 

Social psychologists
Living people
Year of birth missing (living people)
American clinical psychologists